Darb Kalat-e Emamzadeh Mahmud (also Romanized as Darb Kalāt-e Emāmzādeh Maḩmūd; also known as Dar Kalāt-e Maḩmūd and Dar Kalāt-e Maḩmūdī) is a village in Sadat Mahmudi Rural District, Pataveh District, Dana County, Kohgiluyeh and Boyer-Ahmad Province, Iran. At the 2006 census, its population was 720, in 151 families.

References 

Populated places in Dana County